James Coutts Crawford (19 January 1817 – 8 April 1889), known as Coutts Crawford, was a Naval officer, farmer, scientist, explorer and public servant in New Zealand.

He was born in Strathaven, South Lanarkshire, Scotland, the son of naval officer James Coutts Crawford, and his second wife, Jane. He came to New Zealand in 1839. He settled in Wellington and called his land holding Kilbirnie after the town in Scotland; the name is still in use as a Wellington suburb. Crawford was active in local affairs. He served on the New Zealand Legislative Council from 1859 to 1867. He died in London in 1889.

It is likely that Mount Crawford (South Australia) is named after him.

Personal life 
He was educated at the Royal Naval College, Portsmouth. He married:
Sophia Whitley on 28 November 1843; she died in 1852. They had a daughter Janet (1844, m. John Willis) and a son James Dundas (1850). 
Jessie McBarnet in August 1857; she died in 1880. They had three sons: Henry Duncan (1859), Alexander Donald (1862) and Charles John (1867).

References

External links
 Recollections of travel in New Zealand and Australia (1880)
 Geological and Other Reports

1817 births
1889 deaths
Members of the New Zealand Legislative Council
19th-century New Zealand politicians
Scottish emigrants to New Zealand
People from Strathaven
Sheriffs of New Zealand